Ralf Appel (born 18 July 1971) is a German chess grandmaster.

References 

Living people
Chess grandmasters
1971 births